Kadir Has University, also known as KHAS, is a foundation university in Fatih, Istanbul, established in 1997 by , the late Turkish industrialist and philanthropist.

Kadir Has University has six faculties: Faculty of Art and Design; Faculty of Communication; Faculty of Economics, Administrative and Social Sciences; Faculty of Engineering and Natural Sciences; Faculty of Law; and Faculty of Management. Kadir Has University is a research university, which aims to generate high quality research as well as students with competencies of highest standards by developing a new model of education that is application- and project-based. Prof. Dr. M. Sondan Durukanoğlu Feyiz is the current rector of the university. The Core Program, one of these models, aims to leave the traditional education style behind and to equip first year students with the creative and critical questioning skills they will need in all areas of society. As of 2019, they also aim to train graduates who can work anywhere in the world with another education system they have created called New Education Model.

Research institutes at the university include the Centre for Energy and Sustainable Development, Istanbul Studies Center, the Sports Studies Research Center, the Gender and Women’s Studies Centre, the Center for International and European Studies and the Centre for Cybersecurity and Critical Infrastructure Protection.

Kadir Has University also provides financial and consultancy support to its students through organizations such as the Creative Industries Platform (YEP).

History 
The university was founded by the Kadir Has Foundation, established by the late industrialist and philanthropist Kadir Has.
 
The university's campus is located by the Golden Horn in Cibali, Fatih, the capital district of İstanbul, on the European side of the city. The building was originally a tobacco factory, erected in 1884 by the Istanbul-based Ottoman Armenian architect Hovsep Aznavur. The factory was used for nearly seventy years by TEKEL the state tobacco producers. It then fell in disrepair due to the lack of maintenance and eventually was abandoned. It wasn't until the late 1990s when the Kadir Has Foundation came up with the idea to turn this desolated factory building into a university, taking a twenty-nine year lease from Tekel in 1997. During the restoration of the factory, university opened the Bahçelievler campus for the 2000-2001 academic year. After four years of restoration, the university was officially opened on 30 December 2002. After the restoration; Cibali, Selimpaşa and Bahçelievler campuses began to operate simultaneously. At the end of 2007, modern D block was built in order to expand the building. Fatih Municipality and the university worked jointly in 2008 for the construction of gym and related facilities. Cibali Campus was renamed as "Kadir Has Campus" on March 28, 2007. Right now, the building has over 35.000m2 of indoor space plus grounds.

The university's Cibali campus is also home to the Rezan Has Museum, named after the wife of Kadir Has. The museum features an 11th Century cistern, which is one of the few Byzantine structures outside the old city walls, as well as the ruins of an Ottoman era bath.

Core Program 
It is an educational model that aims to enable students to have knowledge about other fields besides their own fields and to become enlightened individuals with the equipment required by the age. In this educational model covering the first grade, instead of the traditional exam system, assignments and projects are included so that students can be constantly active in the program. The core program, which has courses from almost every faculty and every field, aims to involve the student in the developments and situations in the world and to provide the student with the ability to comment in detail on it. The students' perspective on the events is tried to be enriched while the lessons are processed in a controversial way. In addition, during the seminars held under the name "Core Talks", academicians and experts in their field put certain issues on the agenda and inform students and all interested individuals about these issues.

Faculties and Departments

Faculty of Art and Design
 Architecture
 Industrial Design
 Interior Architecture and Environmental Design
 Theatre

Faculty of Communication

 Advertising
 New Media
 Public Relations and Information
 Radio Television and Cinema
 Visual Communication Design

Faculty of Economics, Administrative and Social Sciences
 Accounting and Financial Management
 Banking and Insurance
 Business Administration
 Economics
 International Relations
 International Trade and Finance
 International Trade and Logistics
 Management Information Systems
 Political Science and Public Administration
 Psychology
 Real Estate and Asset Valuation

Faculty of Engineering and Natural Sciences
 Civil Engineering
 Computer Engineering
 Electrical - Electronics Engineering
 Energy Systems Engineering
 Industrial Engineering
 Mechatronics Engineering
 Molecular Biology and Genetics

Faculty of Law
 Law

Campuses

Cibali Campus 
The Kadir Has Campus is located in the historic Tekel Cibali Tobacco Factory building, which was used as Tekel's tobacco warehouse and cigarette factory from 1884 until the campus was opened. The building was repaired and put into service by the university in accordance with its original form. The building is located in a very important area of Istanbul from a historical point of view and is also the winner of the Europa Nostra Award. There are classrooms, laboratories, Khas information center, all faculties, institute, Rezan Has Museum, rectorate and deaneries in the Kadir Has Campus, which has an indoor usage area of more than 45 thousand square meters. In addition, Kadir Has University School of Foreign Languages is located next to the main campus.

Selimpaşa Campus 
Kadir Has Vocational High School provides education in Selimpaşa Campus. Kadir Has Vocational High School is located in Silivri Selimpaşa. This campus, which has modern classrooms, library, conference room, gymnasium, laboratory infrastructure built on 150 acres of land on the shore of the Marmara Sea, offers students a regular, peaceful, pleasant and calm working environment.

Bahçelievler Campus 
Bahçelievler campus used to be used as a School of Foreign Languages. Bahçelievler campus was closed and moved to Balat campus. The preparatory (Yabacı School of Languages) campus has been moved to the building behind the main campus in Balat.

Awards 
In 2003 Kadir Has University won the Europa Nostra Award for the beautiful restoration of a historical place. After this success, again with the same aim, Kadir Has Charity Foundation also bought the C block of the building from TEKEL and restored it, which now hosts the Faculty of Art & Design and the Rezan Has Museum.

41st Istanbul Film Festival Best Actress Award received by Ece Yüksel in 2022
Turkey's Women Leaders Award 2021 (KOÇ-UNESCO), third prize in the category of "Universities Contributing to Gender Equality" received by KHAS Gender and Women's Studies Research Center
The Science Academy Young Scientists Award Program (BAGEP) 2020-2021 Award Received by Dr. Faculty Member Deniz EROĞLU, Molecular Biology, and Genetics- Dr. Faculty Member Emre Ozan POLAT, Mechatronics Engineering- Assoc. Dr. Onurcan YILMAZ, Psychology 
 Sakıp Sabancı International Paper Award 2021 received by Doç. Dr. Onurcan Yılmaz and  Dr. Ozan İşler with the article  “Cognitive and Behavioral Consequences of the COVID-19 Threat Around the World and in Turkey”
 İTÜ 2020 The Most Successful Thesis Award received by Dr. Gürbey Hiz 
Turkish Physical Association Awards 2019, the Honor Award received by Prof. Dr. Sondan Durukanoğlu Feyiz, rector of the Khas,
Sign of The City Awards 2018, “Best Cultural Heritage Conservation and Preservation (Completed Projects)” received by Cibali Campus - School of Foreign Languages building 
2018 Best Reviewer Award from the Journal of the Academy of Marketing Science was received by Prof. Dr. Bülent Mengüç 
2018 Best Short Documentary Award at BUZZ CEE - Buzău International Film Festival was given to Afghanistanbul 
Best Article Award at IEEE-ICC2018 was received by Best Article Award at IEEE-ICC2018 
First prize in the Pandemics and Healthcare Professionals Memorial Space Design Competition was received by Assoc. Prof. Birge Yıldırım Okta and Lecturer Gürkan Okta

See also
 List of universities in Turkey

References

External links

 Official Website of Kadir Has University
 Kadir Has University Graduates Club
 Library of Kadir Has University

 
Educational institutions established in 1997
Private universities and colleges in Turkey
Fatih
1997 establishments in Turkey
Silivri